Aloeides simplex, the dune copper, is a butterfly of the family Lycaenidae. It is found in South Africa, where it is known from sandy areas in the Kalahari and arid savannah, the red dunes from Kuruman, Hotazel and further west in the Northern Cape.

The wingspan is 26–32 mm for males and 29–34 mm females. Adults are on wing from August to November and from January to March. There are two generations per year.

References

Butterflies described in 1893
Aloeides
Endemic butterflies of South Africa